Hemiplecta is a genus of air-breathing land snails, terrestrial pulmonate gastropod mollusks in the subfamily Ariophantinae  of the family Ariophantidae.

Species
 Hemiplecta abbasi Maassen, 2009
 Hemiplecta ambitiosa Fulton, 1921
 Hemiplecta andaiensis (E. A. Smith, 1897)
 Hemiplecta belerang Cilia & Abbas, 2012
 Hemiplecta berschaueri Thach & Abbas, 2020
 Hemiplecta bonthainensis E. A. Smith, 1896
 Hemiplecta braammorrisi (P. Sarasin & F. Sarasin, 1899)
 Hemiplecta cartereti (E. A. Smith, 1884)
 Hemiplecta chevalieri (Souleyet, 1842)
 Hemiplecta crenocarinata Schepman, 1919
 Hemiplecta cymatium (L. Pfeiffer, 1856)
 Hemiplecta darondeaui (Souleyet, 1842)
 Hemiplecta densa (A. Adams & L. A. Reeve, 1850)
 Hemiplecta densegranosa Schepman, 1919
 Hemiplecta denserugata (Möllendorff, 1901)
 Hemiplecta divergens (Brancsik, 1895)
 Hemiplecta doriae (Tapparone Canefri, 1880)
 Hemiplecta dura (Pfeiffer, 1864)
 Hemiplecta egeria E. A. Smith, 1895
 Hemiplecta esculenta Maassen, 2006
 Hemiplecta floweri E. A. Smith, 1899
 Hemiplecta foersteri Kobelt, 1914
 Hemiplecta franzhuberi Thach, 2020
 Hemiplecta funerea (E. A. Smith, 1896)
 Hemiplecta goliath van Benthem Jutting, 1959
 Hemiplecta huberi Thach, 2017 7 (taxon inquirendum, debated synonym)
 Hemiplecta humphreysiana (I. Lea, 1841)
 Hemiplecta jensi Páll-Gergely, 2019
 Hemiplecta juvenilis B. Rensch, 1930
 Hemiplecta khamducensis (Thach & F. Huber, 2018)
 Hemiplecta khamducensis Thach & F. Huber, 2020
 Hemiplecta lanxangnica Inkhavilay & Panha, 2019
 Hemiplecta laotica (Möllendorff, 1899)
 Hemiplecta liei Thach, 2018
 Hemiplecta malaouyi (Morgan, 1885)
 Hemiplecta melleata I. Rensch & B. Rensch, 1929
 Hemiplecta mindanaensis (C. Semper, 1870)
 Hemiplecta neptunus (Pfeiffer, 1854)
 Hemiplecta nobilis (L. Pfeiffer, 1850)
 Hemiplecta obliquata (Reeve, 1854)
 Hemiplecta papuana C. R. Boettger, 1914
 Hemiplecta pharangensis (Möllendorff, 1901)
 Hemiplecta platytaenia Möllendorff, 1900
 Hemiplecta pluto (L. Pfeiffer, 1862)
 Hemiplecta recondita I. Rensch, 1930
 Hemiplecta ribbei (Dohrn, 1883)
 Hemiplecta rollei Möllendorff, 1899
 Hemiplecta rugata (Martens, 1864)
 Hemiplecta sakaya (de Morgan, 1885)
 Hemiplecta sericea Boettger, 1914
 Hemiplecta sibylla C. E. Tapparone-Canefri, 1883
 Hemiplecta simalurensis Laidlaw, 1957
 Hemiplecta soulyetiana (Pfeiffer, 1851)
 Hemiplecta strubelli Möllendorff, 1899
 Hemiplecta textrina (Benson, 1866)
 Hemiplecta totojensis (P. Sarasin & F. Sarasin, 1899)
 Hemiplecta uter (Theobald, 1859)
 Hemiplecta weberi P. & F. Sarasin, 1899
 Hemiplecta wichmanni P. & F. Sarasin, 1899
 Hemiplecta zimmayensis Godwin-Austen, 1888
Species brought into synonymy
 Hemiplecta distincta (Pfeiffer, 1851): synonym of Koratia distincta (L. Pfeiffer, 1850)

References 

 Bank, R. A. (2017). Classification of the Recent terrestrial Gastropoda of the World. Last update: July 16th, 2017.

External links
 Biolib
 Albers, J. C. (1850). Die Heliceen nach natürlicher Verwandtschaft systematisch geordnet. Berlin: Enslin. 262 pp.

Ariophantidae